Charlottesville City Schools, also known as Charlottesville City Public Schools, is the school division that administers public education in the United States city of Charlottesville, Virginia. The current superintendent is Dr. Royal A. Gurley, Jr.

Schools
The school system comprises four levels of school which are, in order from earliest to latest: Elementary, Academy, Middle and High schools.

Elementary schools
The city schools system has six elementary schools which teach Kindergarten, First grade, Second grade, Third grade and Fourth grade.
Burnley-Moran Elementary
Clark Elementary
Greenbrier Elementary
Jackson-Via Elementary
Johnson Elementary
Venable Elementary

Upper Elementary school
Unlike most traditional American school systems, Charlottesville City schools have an Upper Elementary which adds an additional step between Elementary school and Middle/Jr. High school. The school is Walker Upper Elementary school and it teaches Fifth grade and Sixth grade. Walker Elementary is named after Hazewell H. Walker, who was a teacher in the school system. He was also a Rotarian.

Middle school
Buford Middle school is the system's middle school. It teaches Seventh grade and Eighth grade.

High school

The system has only one high school which is Charlottesville High School. It teaches Ninth grade, Tenth grade, Eleventh grade and Twelfth grade.

History 
Charlottesville's public schools were segregated for decades. Despite the Brown v. Board of Education decision, the school board refused to integrate. A lawsuit representing black students from Burley High School and the Jefferson School led the city to undertake the strategy of Massive Resistance, closing the public schools to avoid integrating.

References

External links

Charlottesville City Public Schools (Official website)

School divisions in Virginia
Education in Charlottesville, Virginia